The Calabash Nebula, also known as the Rotten Egg Nebula or by its technical name OH 231.84 +4.22, is a protoplanetary nebula (PPN) 1.4 light years (13 Pm) long and located some 5,000 light years (47 Em) from Earth in the constellation Puppis. The name "Calabash Nebula" was first proposed in 1989 in an early paper on its expected nebular dynamics, based on the nebula's appearance.
The Calabash is almost certainly a member of the open cluster Messier 46, as it has the same distance, radial velocity, and proper motion. The central star is QX Puppis, a binary composed of a very cool mira variable and an A-type main-sequence star.

Description
Violent gas collisions that produced supersonic shock fronts in a dying star are seen in a detailed image from NASA's Hubble Space Telescope.

The object is sometimes called the Rotten Egg Nebula as it contains a relatively large amount of sulphur.  The densest parts of the nebula are composed of material ejected recently by the central star and accelerated in opposite directions. This material, shown as yellow in the image, is zooming away at speeds up to one and a half million kilometers per hour (one million miles per hour). Most of the star's original mass is now contained in these bipolar gas structures.

A team of Spanish and US astronomers used NASA's Hubble Space Telescope to study how the gas stream rams into the surrounding material, shown in blue. They believe that such interactions dominate the formation process in planetary nebulae. Due to the high speed of the gas, shock-fronts are formed on impact and heat the surrounding gases. Although computer calculations had predicted the existence and structure of such shocks for some time, previous observations had not been able to prove the theory.

This new Hubble image used filters that only let through light from ionized hydrogen and nitrogen atoms. Astronomers were able to distinguish the warmest parts of the gas heated by the violent shocks and found that they form a complex double-bubble shape. The bright yellow-orange colors in the picture show how dense, high-speed gas is flowing from the star, like supersonic speeding bullets ripping through a medium in opposite directions. The central star itself is hidden in the dusty band at the center.

Much of the gas flow observed today seems to stem from a sudden acceleration that took place about 800 years ago. Astronomers believe that 1,000 years from now, the Calabash Nebula will become a fully developed planetary nebula.

Ground-based imagery
In wide field images, the Calabash nebula is visible near the bright planetary nebula NGC 2438 in deep photographs. Although the Calabash Nebula is at the same distance as M46, NGC 2438 is a larger object in the foreground.

Gallery

Notes 

Radius = distance × sin(angular size / 2) = 5 kly * sin(1′ / 2) = 0.7 ly
9.47 apparent magnitude - 5 * (log10(1,500 pc distance) - 1) = -1.4 absolute magnitude

References

Sources

External links

PIA04228: Rotten Egg Nebula, NASA Planetary Photojournal
 The Rotten Egg Planetary Nebula, APOD 1999 November 1
The Making of the Rotten Egg Nebula, APOD 2001 September 3
 Calabash Nebula at Constellation Guide
Calabash Nebula imaged and interpreted by Bo Reipurth at the European Southern Observatory in 1987

Protoplanetary nebulae
Puppis